The  is a Japanese award given since 2011 to comic books created outside Japan and translated to Japanese. The word "gaiman" is a shortening of gaikoku no manga (foreign manga), encompassing styles like American comics, French bande dessinée and Korean manhwa. The award is sponsored by Kyoto International Manga Museum, Kitakyushu Manga Museum and Meiji University's Yonezawa Memorial Library of Manga and Subculture and was created to raise awareness of non-Japanese comics in Japan.

Winners

References

External links
  

Comics awards
Japanese awards
2011 establishments in Japan